The 2021–22 Dhaka Second Division Football League, also known as Bashundhara Group Second Division Football League for sponsorship reasons. A total of 18 teams, divided into two groups of nine teams,  participating in the league.
The winner of the league is promoted to Senior Division League.

Saif Sporting Club Youth Team is the current 2021–22 season champion.

Overview before the season 
A total of 18 teams will join the league, including five promoted from 2019–20 Dhaka Third Division Football League.

Teams promoted from Third Division

Alamgir Somaj Kollayan O Krira Sangshad
Bikrampur Kings
Jabid Ahsan Sohel Krira Chakra
Kingstar Sporting Club
Kallol Sangho

Other teams

Arambagh Football Academy
Bangladesh Krira Shikkha Protishtan football team
City Club
Saif Sporting Club Youth Team
Khilgaon Football Academy
Gouripur Sporting Club
Little Friends Club
B.G. Press Sports and Recreation Club
Siddikbazar Dhaka Junior Sporting Club
Kodomtola Sangshad
Tongi Krira Chakra
Purbachal Parishad
Jatrabari Jhotika Sangshad

Format 
This edition of Second Division League is made up of a total of 18 clubs divided into two groups of 9 teams. The nine teams in each group play each other once. After completing the group stage of the league, the five teams that accumulate the most points in each group, qualify for the Super League round and bottom placed team from each group will be relegated.

In Super League round, ten teams will compete for promotion. The top three teams will be promoted to next edition of Senior Division League.

Venue 
The opening ceremony and opening match was held at Bashundhara Kings Arena of Bashundhara Sports Complex, Dhaka.

The rest of the matches were played at Bir Sherestha Shaheed Shipahi Mostafa Kamal Stadium of Kamalapur, Dhaka.

Groups

Group A

League table

Group B

League table

Super League

League table

Statistics

Goalscorers

Unknown Goalscorers
Bikrampur Kings 1-3 Siddikbazar Dhaka Jr. SC match of 4 goals scorers players name unknown.

Arambagh FA 0-1 Siddikbazar Dhaka Jr. SC match of 1 goals scorers players name unknown.

B.G. Press SRC 0-1 Little Friends Club match of 1 goals scorers players name unknown.

Super League: Gouripur SC 3-5 Siddikbazar Dhaka Jr. SC match of 8 goals scorers players name unknown.

Super League: Kallol Sangha 0-4 Siddikbazar Dhaka Jr. SC match of 4 goals scorers players name unknown.

Super League: Purbachal Parishad 0-1 Saif Sporting Club Youth Team match of 1 goal scorers players name unknown.

Super League: Kadamtola Sangsad 0-1 Siddikbazar Dhaka Jr. SC match of 1 goal scorers players name unknown.

See also 
 2021–22 Dhaka Senior Division Football League

References 

Dhaka Second Division Football League
2021 in Bangladeshi football
2020 in Bangladeshi football